Les Sirènes is a Glasgow-based women's chamber choir consisting of 26 vocalists, all students and graduates of the Royal Conservatoire of Scotland (formerly the Royal Scottish Academy of Music and Drama).   In October 2012, the choir was awarded the prestigious title of Choir of the Year 2012, after an extensive UK-wide search and a competitive Grand Final held at London's Royal Festival Hall.

The Choir
Les Sirènes was established in 2007 by present musical director Andrew Nunn and performs regularly across Scotland and beyond, having given concerts in renowned venues such as Glasgow Cathedral, the SECC, Dunkeld Cathedral, Paisley Abbey, the Mackintosh Church, the Queen's Hall, the Glasgow Royal Concert Hall and London’s Cadogan Hall.  The choir has also performed in more obscure locations, having "sung on the subway" as part of the Strathclyde Partnership for Transport (SPT) promotion of the Glasgow underground.

As well as their victory in the Choir of the Year competition, the choir reached the semi-final stage of BBC1’s Last Choir Standing in 2008.  The ensemble has given the première performances of two works by composer Gareth Williams; Discipline in 2009 and Gethsemane in 2010, and is often called upon to collaborate with other artists.  In October 2009 the choir performed with female vocal harmony group All Angels as part of the Paisley Choral Festival, and in December of the same year some members sang with the orchestra of Scottish Opera as part of the Children's Classics concerts in Edinburgh and Glasgow.  In 2008 the choir collaborated with director Marilyn Imry in a performance of a play called The Bones Boys, which was broadcast on BBC Radio Scotland.  Wherever they perform or whatever the occasion, Les Sirènes is passionate about performance.

Musical Director
Twenty-four-year-old Andrew was born in Middlesbrough where he attended the Egglescliffe School Arts College and took up the oboe at the age of 15.  Having obtained his first MMus and a BMus(Hons) as an oboe/cor anglais player and singer, Andrew is now studying for a Masters in Choral Conducting at the Royal Conservatoire of Scotland (formerly Royal Scottish Academy of Music and Drama).

Andrew's passion for choral music began as a member of the Tees Valley Youth Choir, which progressed to the grand final of the 2006 BBC Choir of the Year Competition.  In the summer of 2012 Andrew became the first Student Conductor of the National Youth Choir of Scotland, helping to prepare the flagship SATB choir for performances at the BBC Proms and the Edinburgh Festival Fringe.  In September of the previous year, Andrew was awarded The Sir Alexander Gibson Memorial Fellowship for Choral Conductors with the Royal Scottish National Orchestra, working alongside Chorus Director Timothy Dean.

Andrew has conducted the Royal Conservatoire Chamber Choir in a recording of new work Scotland Behold and in a concert in celebration of the 117th anniversary of the birth of composer Peter Warlock.  Andrew has recently been appointed Conductor of the Junior Conservatoire Chamber Choir, Hutchesons' Choral Society and Thomas Coats Memorial Choral Society.  He is Director of Choirs at the East Glasgow Music School and Assistant Tutor for the Yorkshire Youth Choir.  Andrew is also studying singing under the tuition of Gordon Wilson, recent solo engagements include Edinburgh Festival Fringe performances of Dixit Dominus (Handel) and Vesperae Solennes de Confessore (Mozart), as well as recitals as part of the 2011 and 2012 Paisley Choral Festivals.

Choir of the Year 2012
In 2012, over 5,000 singers from 138 singing groups entered the Choir of the Year competition in a bid to win the UK’s most prestigious choral prize. After a series of regional heats, 16 choirs were chosen to compete in the Category Finals at Manchester's Bridgewater Hall.  Winners of the Adult, Youth, Children's and Open Categories were selected as Grand Finalists, alongside two Wild Cards, of which Les Sirènes were one.  These six finalists sang for the title of Choir of the Year in a tense Grand Final at the Royal Festival Hall, London on 28 October 2012.

The competition was judged by Broadway and West End star Ruthie Henshall, Associate Musical Director of the National Youth Choirs of Great Britain Greg Beardsell, and Mary King, renowned performer, presenter, creative director and vocal coach.  Les Sirènes' performance of Oh Soldier Soldier arr. Robert Latham and Billy Joel's beautiful And so it goes thrilled the audience and judging panel alike,  Ruthie Henshall said: "Les Sirènes won me over instantly. Their music went straight to my core and I didn’t want to miss a moment".

As winners, Les Sirènes will commission a new choral work by a composer of their choice, working with BBC Radio 3 over the coming months.

The Final, presented by Only Men Aloud’s Tim Rhys Evans and TV presenter Josie d'Arby was broadcast on BBC Radio 3's The Choir on Sunday 11 November and televised on BBC4 on Friday 23 November 2012.

Critical reception
"Absolutely stunning...that was spellbinding."
Aled Jones

"The best legato singing of full-toned piano I have ever heard.  It was fantastic."
Mary King, Choir of the Year 2012, Grand Final

"You had me on a soul level, you literally went into my core and I felt choked up.  The blend of your voices was so beautiful, that I was just totally yours."
Ruthie Henshall, Choir of the Year 2012, Grand Final
"Your legato is sumptuous. I love this choir."
Greg Beardsell, Choir of the Year 2012, Grand Final

"Lovely rich tone like a velvety red wine! You all know how to use your voices and it looked effortless."
Shirley Court, Choir of the Year 2012, Category Finals

"Andrew Nunn, their thoroughly likeable MD is a natural with audiences and has a precise but wonderfully communicative style of conducting, as well as making his direction of choir, string orchestra and piano look totally effortless."  
Iona Bain, The Herald June 2010

References

External links
 Official Website
 Les Sirènes on Twitter
 Les Sirènes on Facebook
 YouTube Channel
 Choir of the Year Website
 Royal Conservatoire of Scotland Official Website

Chamber choirs
Scottish choirs
Women's choirs
Music in Glasgow
Musical groups established in 2007
2007 establishments in Scotland
Women's organisations based in Scotland